Lepidodactylus labialis, also known as the Mindanao false gecko or dark-spotted smooth-scaled gecko, is a species of gecko. It is endemic to the Philippines. It is sometimes placed in the genus Pseudogekko.

References

Lepidodactylus
Lizards of Asia
Reptiles of the Philippines
Endemic fauna of the Philippines
Reptiles described in 1867
Taxa named by Wilhelm Peters